Alnwick District Council elections were generally held every four years between the council's creation in 1974 and its abolition in 2009. Alnwick District was a non-metropolitan district in Northumberland, England. The council was abolished and its functions transferred to Northumberland County Council with effect from 1 April 2009.

Political control
The first election to the council was held in 1973, initially operating as a shadow authority before coming into its powers on 1 April 1974. From 1973 until its abolition in 2009 political control of the council was held by the following parties:

Council elections
1973 Alnwick District Council election
1976 Alnwick District Council election
1979 Alnwick District Council election (New ward boundaries)
1983 Alnwick District Council election
1987 Alnwick District Council election
1991 Alnwick District Council election
1995 Alnwick District Council election
1999 Alnwick District Council election (New ward boundaries increased the number of seats by one)
2003 Alnwick District Council election
2007 Alnwick District Council election

District result maps

By-election results

1995-1999

1999-2003

2003-2007

References

 By-election results

 
Council elections in Northumberland
Alnwick (district)
District council elections in England